Herbert Wehnert (born April 28, 1947) is a former West German handball player who competed in the 1972 Summer Olympics.

In 1972 he was part of the West German team which finished sixth in the Olympic tournament. He played five matches and scored twelve goals.

External links

1947 births
Living people
German male handball players
Olympic handball players of West Germany
Handball players at the 1972 Summer Olympics